Joseph Roulson (7 October 1891 – 1952) was an English professional footballer who played as a right half. He played for Birmingham both before and after the First World War, making 125 appearances in all competitions, and helped them win the championship of the Football League Second Division in 1920–21.

Roulson, a native of Sheffield, became a steelworker, and signed for Birmingham from his works team, Cammell Laird of the Sheffield Works League. He was a competitive, "hard-man" type of half-back, similar to his teammate Percy Barton. After leaving Birmingham he played for Swansea Town and Clapton Orient and then returned to Sheffield. He died in 1952, aged about 60.

References

1891 births
1952 deaths
Footballers from Sheffield
English footballers
Association football wing halves
Birmingham City F.C. players
Swansea City A.F.C. players
Leyton Orient F.C. players
English Football League players
Date of death missing